Discovery Peak is a peak in the Diablo Range of California and is the highest point in Alameda County. The officially unnamed peak is also known as Valpe Ridge–Rose Flat due to its location near Rose Flat.
The area is high enough to receive occasional snowfall during the winter, which generally melts within a few days of falling.

History
Discovery Peak was named in 1991 after it was "discovered" by highpointer Dinesh Desai while studying a topo map. Field work by Gordon MacLeod and others supports Desai's conclusion,
but this is in conflict with numerous official county documents that list nearby Rose Peak as the highest point.

References

See also
 List of highest points in California by county

Mountains of Alameda County, California
Diablo Range
Mountains of the San Francisco Bay Area
Mountains of Northern California